The Mészáros effect "is the main physical process that alters the shape 
of the initial power spectrum of fluctuations in the cold dark matter
theory of cosmological structure formation".
It was introduced in 1974 by Péter Mészáros
considering the behavior of dark matter perturbations in the range around 
the radiation-matter equilibrium redshift  and up to the radiation 
decoupling redshift . This showed that, for a non-baryonic 
cold dark matter not coupled to radiation, the small initial perturbations expected to 
give rise to the present day large scale structures experience below 
an additional distinct growth period  which alters the initial fluctuation power spectrum, 
and allows sufficient time for the fluctuations to grow into galaxies and galaxy clusters by 
the present epoch. This involved introducing and solving a joint radiation plus dark 
matter perturbation equation for the density fluctuations , 

,

the variable ,
The analytical solution has a growing mode 
.
This is referred to as the Mészáros effect, or Mészáros equation. 
The process is independent of whether the cold dark matter consists of elementary particles or macroscopic 
objects. It determines the cosmological transfer function of the original fluctuation spectrum,
and it has been incorporated in all subsequent treatments of cosmological large 
scale structure evolution (e.g.

).

A more specific galaxy formation scenario involving this effect was discussed by Mészáros in 1975
explicitly assuming that the dark matter might consist of approximately solar mass 
primordial black holes, an idea which has received increased attention (e.g.
)
after the discovery in 2015 of gravitational waves from stellar-mass black holes.

References 

Dark matter